Kavater (also Romanized as Kavāter) is a village in Kut-e Abdollah Rural District, in the Central District of Karun County, Khuzestan Province, Iran. At the 2006 census, its population was 468, in 87 families.

References 

Populated places in Karun County